Shoeburyness (also called Shoebury) is a suburb of the city of Southend-on-Sea, in the City of Southend-on-Sea, in the ceremonial county of Essex, England.  east of the city centre. It was an urban district of Essex from 1894 to 1933, when it became part of the county borough of Southend-on-Sea. It is now in the unparished area of Southend-on-Sea, in the Southend-on-Sea district. It was once a garrison town and still acts as host to MoD Shoeburyness.

Shoeburyness is divided into halves; Shoeburyness refers to all of the town, but North Shoebury refers to the area that houses Shoeburyness High School and the nearby churches.

Description

The eastern terminus of the London, Tilbury and Southend line (c2c line) is at Shoeburyness railway station, services run to London Fenchurch Street in the City of London. The eastern end of the A13 is at Shoeburyness. The MoD Shoeburyness site at Pig's Bay is situated nearby and the facility is run by the company QinetiQ.

Shoeburyness has two beaches: East Beach and Shoebury Common Beach (also known as West Beach), both Blue Flag beaches.

East Beach is a sandy/pebbly beach around a quarter of a mile long and is sandwiched between the Pig's Bay MoD site and the former Shoeburyness Artillery barracks. Access to the large gravel/grass pay-and-display car park is via Rampart Terrace. East Beach is the site of a defence boom, built in 1944, to prevent enemy shipping and submarines from accessing the River Thames.

The majority of the boom was dismantled after the war, but around one mile still remains, stretching out into the Thames Estuary. East Beach benefits from a large grassy area immediately adjacent to the sands, which is suitable for informal sports and family fun. Nearby is the site of the Iron Age Danish Camp.

At the beginning of the Second World War, the depositing of a magnetic ground mine in the mud at the mouth of the Thames by the Luftwaffe was observed at Shoeburyness. Various sinkings of ships near the English coast in the preceding months were thought by many to be due to U-boat torpedoes, though the Admiralty suspected magnetic mines were being used. The heroic recovery of an intact mine on 23 November 1939, by Lieutenant Commanders Ouvry and Lewis from HMS Vernon made it possible for the Navy to study it and devise countermeasures to neutralise it; among these were the degaussing cables installed in merchant ships in Allied and British fleets, and, of course, wooden minesweepers.

Shoebury Common Beach is bounded to the east by the land formerly occupied by the Shoeburyness Artillery barracks and continues into Jubilee Beach. Shoebury Common Beach is the site of many beach huts located on both the promenade and the beach. A Coast Guard watch tower at the eastern end of the beach keeps watch over the sands and mudflats while listening out for distress calls over the radio. A cycle path skirts around the sea-front linking the East Beach to Shoebury Common Beach, and thence into Southend and a number of other towns, including Leigh-on-Sea.

In popular culture

The English painter J. M. W. Turner depicted the fishermen of Shoeburyness in his oil painting Shoeburyness Fishermen Hailing a Whitstable Hoy. The painting was exhibited in 1809, and was part of a series Turner made of the Thames estuary between 1808 and 1810. The painting has been in the collection of the National Gallery of Canada since 1939.

In the fifth Temeraire novel Victory of Eagles (2008) by Naomi Novik, Shoeburyness is the setting of a fictitious climactic battle in which Wellesley and Nelson drive Napoleon out of England in early 1808.

Shoeburyness is home to "the commuter", protagonist in the eponymous song and music video by Ceephax Acid Crew.

Shoeburyness is mentioned in the Porridge episode "The Harder They Fall" (S2 E6), at approximately 6'10".

Shoeburyness is one of the better-known entrants in Douglas Adams' and John Lloyd's 1990 spoof dictionary The Deeper Meaning of Liff. It is defined as "the vague feeling of uncomfortableness caused by sitting on a bus seat still warm from someone else's bottom".

Shoeburyness is referenced in the Billy Bragg song "A13 Trunk Road to the Sea" and in the Ian Dury song "Billericay Dickie".

Shoeburyness was featured in the Viral Marketing for the Universal Pictures 2022 American science fiction action film sequel Jurassic World Dominion, with a number of the featured videos on the DinoTracker website filmed in the area doubling for locations around the world.

Climate

Notable people
 Tony Holland (1940–2007), BBC screenwriter, was born in Shoeburyness
 Godfrey Rampling (1909–2009), English athlete, notably trained and spent a lot of time in the town, eventually announcing his retirement there

References

External links

Towns in Essex
Populated coastal places in Essex
Southend-on-Sea (town)